Isa Adejoro Adeogun (born 23 June 1967) is a Nigerian politician. He is a member of the House of Representatives of Nigeria, representing Akoko South East/Akoko South West Federal Constituency of Ondo State. He is currently serving his first term in the National Assembly having been elected in March 2019 on the platform of the All Progressives Congress (APC).

References

Living people
1967 births
All Progressives Congress politicians
Members of the House of Representatives (Nigeria)
Politicians from Ondo State
21st-century Nigerian politicians